This is a list of Malayalam films that released in 2023.

January – March

April – June

References

External links 

2023
Lists of 2023 films by country or language
 2023